L-368,899 is a drug used in scientific research which acts as a selective antagonist of the oxytocin receptor, with good selectivity over the related vasopressin receptors. Unlike related drugs such as the peripherally selective L-371,257, the oral bioavailabity is high and the brain penetration of L-368,899 is rapid, with selective accumulation in areas of the limbic system. This makes it a useful tool for investigating the centrally mediated roles of oxytocin, such as in social behaviour and pair bonding, and studies in primates have shown L-368,899 to reduce a number of behaviours such as food sharing, sexual activity and caring for infants, demonstrating the importance of oxytocinergic signalling in mediating these important social behaviours.

See also
 Atosiban
 Barusiban
 Epelsiban
 L-371,257
 Retosiban

References

Oxytocin receptor antagonists
Phenylpiperazines
Tocolytics
2-Tolyl compounds